
Gairo may refer to:

Burkina Faso
 Gairo, Burkina Faso, village in Bougouriba Province, south-western Burkina Faso

Italy
 Gairo, Sardinia, comune on the island of Sardinia, Italy

Tanzania
 Gairo, Tanzania, town in Morogoro Region, central Tanzania
 Gairo Constituency, parliamentary constituency in Morogoro Region, central Tanzania
 Gairo District, administrative district, Morogoro Region, central Tanzania

See also
 Cairo (disambiguation)